A terrarium (plural: terraria or terrariums) is usually a sealable glass container containing soil and plants that can be opened for maintenance to access the plants inside; however, terraria can also be open to the atmosphere. Terraria are often kept as ornamental items. 

A closed terrarium's transparent walls allow heat and light to enter, creating a unique environment for plant growth. Heat entering the sealed container allows the creation of a small water cycle due to evaporating moisture from the soil and plants. The water vapor then condenses onto the walls of the container, eventually falling back onto the plants and soil below. Light passing through the transparent walls, allowing photosynthesis, with the constant water supply provide an ideal environment for plants. Open terraria are not sealed and are better suited to plants requiring a more arid environment.

History

The first terrarium was developed by botanist Nathaniel Bagshaw Ward in 1842. Ward had an interest in observing insect behaviour and accidentally left one of his jars unattended. A fern spore in the jar grew and germinated into a plant, becoming the first known terrarium. The trend quickly spread in the Victorian Era amongst the English. Instead of the terrarium, it was known as the Wardian case.

Ward hired carpenters to build his Wardian cases to export native British plants to Sydney, Australia. After months of travel, the plants arrived well and thriving. Likewise, plants from Australia sent to London using the same method were received by Ward in pristine condition. His experiment indicated plants can be sealed, without ventilation, and continue thriving. Wardian cases were used for many decades by Kew Gardens to ship plants around the British Empire and were also used during European colonization of Africa to bring African goods, like spices and coffee, back to Europe.

Types
Terraria are typically classified into two categories: closed and open. Closed terraria are sealed shut with a lid, door, or cork; open terraria have access to fresh air, most commonly by leaving the container open or through a hole drilled into the container.

Closed terraria
 thumb|Diagram of sealed terrarium

Tropical plant varieties, such as moss, orchids, ferns, and air plants are generally kept within closed terraria to replicate their native humid, sheltered environment in the tropics. Keeping the terrarium sealed allows for circulation of water, making the terrarium self-sufficient. The terrarium may be opened once a week, allowing evaporation of excess moisture from the air and walls of the container, to prevent growth of mold or algae, which may damage plants and discolor the sides of the terrarium. Springtails may be used to consume mold or fungi within the terrarium.

Any wilting plants or absence of condensation on the walls of the terrarium indicates the terrarium requires water; watering is primarily done using a spray bottle.

Closed terraria benefit from specific soil mixes to ensure ideal growing conditions and reduce risk of microbial damage; a common medium used is peat-lite: a mixture of peat moss, vermiculite, and perlite. The mixture should be sterile to minimize risk of introducing potentially harmful microbes to the terrarium.

Open terraria

Not all plants require or are suited to the moist environment of closed terraria; open terraria are better suited for plants preferring less humidity and soil moisture, such as temperate plants and plants adapted to dry climates. Open terraria also work well for plants requiring more (but not direct) sunlight, as closed terraria can trap excess heat, potentially killing the plants inside. While open terraria require more watering than closed terraria, they have reduced risk of disease due to their lower humidity.

An open terrarium should not be confused with a dish garden. A terrarium, even open, allows for increased humidity compared to the environment outside the structure, whereas a dish garden does not provide additional humidity. Due to the transparent walls of terraria causing magnification of the sun's rays, terraria cannot be placed in direct sunlight because the intense light will cause foliage to burn. A dish garden can tolerate direct sun, as long as it is planted with full sun-tolerant plants. Succulents and cacti are better suited for a dish garden than a terrarium because dish gardens allow succulents and cacti to be placed in the full sun they require without burning.

See also
 Aquarium
 Bottle garden
 Ecosphere (aquarium)
 Greenhouse
 Paludarium
 Vivarium

References

External links 
 

Types of garden